Moment of Truth: Cradle of Conspiracy is a 1994 American made-for-television drama film directed by Gabrielle Beaumont. The film is a part of the Moment of Truth franchise and premiered on NBC on May 2, 1994. Filming took place in Los Angeles.

Plot 
Kristin Guthrie is a teenager growing up in an upper-class environment. She has trouble living up to her mother Suzanne's ideals and she starts to rebel by dating Kenny, a young man of whom her parents become immediately suspicious. Fearful of losing their daughter, they allow her to see him, until their nightmare comes true: Kristin runs away with Kenny. It soon turns out that Kenny is working in the black market, illegally selling babies he fathers with other girls. He also impregnates Kristin, planning to sell their baby after its birth as well. Meanwhile, her parents are desperately searching for their daughter.

Cast
Dee Wallace as Suzanne Guthrie
Danica McKellar as Kristin Guthrie
Kurt Deutsch as Kenny Trask
Carmen Argenziano as Jack Guthrie
Geoffrey Thorne as Gary Pritchard
Merle Kennedy as Janine
Ellen Crawford as Lorna Gill
Shannon Fill as Pami
Jamie Luner as Donna
Burke Byrnes as Detective Otis

References

External links

1994 television films
1994 films
1994 drama films
Films scored by Mark Snow
American films based on actual events
Films directed by Gabrielle Beaumont
Films shot in Los Angeles
NBC network original films
Teenage pregnancy in film
American drama television films
1990s American films